Park Hong-keun (born 8 October 1969) is a South Korean politician in the liberal Democratic Party of Korea, presently a member of the National Assembly for Jungnang, Seoul, since 2012. Originally elected to the Assembly in the Jungnang B constituency by a margin of 854 votes—0.9 percent—over his Saenuri Party competitor, Kang Dong-ho, in the 2016 election he faced off another challenge from Kang, defeating him by a margin of 7.6 percent.

Supporting Chung Dong-young's bid in the 2007 presidential election, Park chaired the United New Democratic Party's Youth Campaign that year. He entered the Assembly in 2012. In September 2012, he submitted a legislative amendment allowing the government to rescind the licenses of businesses refusing to abide by local ordinances.

In 2013, Park attacked the Park Geun-hye government for abetting, as he saw it, Japan's resumption of a right to collective self-defense under Shinzō Abe. Subsequently, in the context of the controversy over the Chinese Air Defense Identification Zone in the East China Sea, in December that year he noted the importance of Socotra Rock, an underwater reef disputed by South Korea and China. He stated that only two thirds of the middle- and high-school textbooks he had analyzed mentioned the reef, and called for textbooks to be revised to include information on it.

Park received his undergraduate degree in Korean language at literature from Kyung Hee University, and went on to take a master's degree in public administration there. He was subsequently active in a number of civic groups, serving as co-president of the Korea Youth Corps and director of Volunteering Korea.

References

1969 births
Kyung Hee University alumni
Living people
Members of the National Assembly (South Korea)
Minjoo Party of Korea politicians
People from Goheung County